Lom is a dispersed settlement in the hills north of Mežica in the Carinthia region in northern Slovenia.

References

External links
Lom on Geopedia

Populated places in the Municipality of Mežica